Sivricek is a village in the Kurşunlu District of Çankırı Province in Turkey. Its population is 254 (2021). Before the 2013 reorganisation, it was a town (belde).

References

Villages in Kurşunlu District